Nuwerus is a settlement in Matzikama Municipality, West Coast District in the Western Cape province of South Africa.

Village 16 km south-east of Bitterfontein and 70 km north-west of Vanrhynsdorp. The name is Afrikaans and means ‘new rest’.

References

Populated places in the Matzikama Local Municipality